Bridgeport is an unincorporated community in Smoky View Township, Saline County, Kansas, United States.  As of the 2020 census, the population of the community and nearby areas was 64.  It is located south of Salina, along K-4 near Interstate 135.

History
A post office was opened in Bridgeport in 1879, and remained in operation until it was discontinued in 1976.

Two railroads previously ran through Bridgeport, but were later abandoned.

Geography
The Smoky Hill River flows through the community.  Its elevation is 1,302 feet (397 m), and it is located at  (38.6277833, -97.6130924).

Climate
The climate in this area is characterized by hot, humid summers and generally mild to cool winters.  According to the Köppen Climate Classification system, Bridgeport has a humid subtropical climate, abbreviated "Cfa" on climate maps.

Demographics

For statistical purposes, the United States Census Bureau has defined Bridgeport as a census-designated place (CDP). Also, this community is a part of the Salina micropolitan area.

Education
The community is served by Southeast of Saline USD 306 public school district.

References

Further reading

External links
 Saline County maps: Current, Historic, KDOT

Unincorporated communities in Saline County, Kansas
Unincorporated communities in Kansas
1879 establishments in Kansas
Populated places established in 1879